Kiplimo Kimutai (born December 10, 1981) is a male long-distance runner from Kenya.

Achievements

References

1981 births
Living people
Kenyan male long-distance runners
Kenyan male marathon runners